Ceatalchioi is a commune in Tulcea County, Northern Dobruja, Romania. It is composed of four villages: Ceatalchioi, Pătlăgeanca (historical name: Principesa Ileana), Plauru (historical name: Lascăr Catargiu), and Sălceni.

See also
Action of 26 June 1941

References

External links

Communes in Tulcea County
Localities in Northern Dobruja
Place names of Turkish origin in Romania